Ancient diet is mainly determined by food's accessibility which involves location, geography and climate while ancient health is affected by food consumption apart from external factors such as diseases and plagues. There are still a lot of doubt about this ancient diet due to lack of evidence. Similar to what anthropologist Amanda Henry has said, there are a lot of time periods in the human history but there are only theories to answer questions on what people actually ate then. Only recently have traces been discovered in what was left of these people.

Ancient diet

Methods used in determining ancient diet
PaleofecesThese are ancient human feces found in archaeological excavations that help identify the food, diet and nutrition of the ancient people. Though it may not sound sanitary, the dried coprolite itself, a term used interchangeably, has no particular smell. There is a high quantity of paleofeces because everyone does it and they do it anywhere. Not only does it give the DNA of a single organism, but also the DNA of everything it ate. The study of paleofeces has actually helped eliminate the belief that ancient people subsisted on foraged berries. 
TartarThis is a hard substance that builds up on human teeth after dental plaque solidifies. Because ancient teeth still hold onto tiny pieces of food and bacteria, the study of tartar can help reveal what people ate and information on an individual’s health. Researchers and scientists use molecular methods and the microscope to examine the samples

Factors that affect diet
GeographyThis is considered one of the most important factors that play a huge role in determining what people eat, as it dictates what they are able to access. The Philippines, being an archipelago, is surrounded by different bodies of water making seafood one of the main dishes in Filipino diet. There is also a great variety of land animals such as the water buffalo (carabao) and pigs that were consumed due to the Philippine landscape. Vegetation and planting was also possible due to rich tropical soils present.
Climate/temperature In the Philippines, even though temperature differences are minimal, it still produces significant differences. These include vegetational differences and difference in forest species distribution as well as some properties of wood.Vegatational differences involve tropical plants that tend to grow in lower altitudes and plants mostly found in middle latitudes that grown in high altitudes such as Baguio.
PrecipitationThe quantity and seasonality of rainfall greatly affects the distributional patterns of the natural vegetation often determining the kind of landscape as well as the species that will be present. In the Philippines, water availability also affects the selection of crops to be planted, for example, rice versus corn. Tropical soils are also greatly affected by differences in the availability of moisture.

Food sources

Flora
Five crop plants form the bases for agricultural patterns in the Philippines. This includes rice, corn, yams and sweet potatoes, banana and coconut. Rice and banana are almost always present in the agricultural landscape and agricultural combinations include one or both crops. As food staples, three crops dominate - rice, corn, and yam-sweet potato group. Other crops are considered as complements, snack foods or seasonal.
RiceReferred to as palay, it is considered the traditional staple food in the Philippines it being consumed by about three-fourths of the population. It is the primary crop on most of the Philippine farms and is grown on more farms than any other single crop because rice has few environmental restrictions. Temperatures are suitable everywhere except in the highest mountain country. In other places, restrictions are negated due to provision of irrigation or planting during the rainy season. Because of its favorable conditions, Central Luzon is the largest regional producer while Mindanao is the source of the largest surpluses.
CornKnown locally as mais, corn was first introduced in Visayas during the sixteenth century and eventually spread to other parts of the Philippines. Because of its adaptability and affordability, it has been considered a common replacement for rice and has been steadily rising in importance as a Philippine crop and food staple. Corn can be grown almost everywhere in the Philippines even on drier soils and is being planted somewhere year-round. There are many varieties of corn grown but flint corns are the most common because of better adaptation in the making of "corn rice”. Though planting of corn is abundant, it suffers from a wide range of diseases and pests in the Philippine environment. It is in Southern Mindanao, Northeast Luzon and the Visayan islands of Cebu, Bohol, Leyte and Negros where corn is the dominant food crop.
Root CropsProbably the oldest group of food crops in the Philippines, root crops includes yams, taros, sweet potato and manioc. Although rice has already replaced yams and taros as the preferred root crop, it still remains as the dominant food in some regions and has assumed complementary roles in others. The coming of the Spaniards also brought sweet potato, manioc and peanuts in the country. Sweet potato, commonly known as camote, has replaced yams in regions that still considered it as their staple food. Manioc also known as cassava, on the other hand, became a complementary crop. Peanut also became a complementary crop and became widely distributed but not commonly grown. These root crops have been considered as the staple food for the poor, thrifty or hard-time crop. The sweet potato, yam and manioc are widely grown in hill countries of Leyte and Sorsogon Peninsula of Southern Luzon.
Vegetable CropsThis kind of crop did not gain popularity unlike the first three because the shifting-cultivation background employed gathering of wild products as a complementary aspect of the dietary economy. Kitchen gardens mostly contained herbs and vines while seasoning has not been significant to native Filipino cookery, however this is up to debate as trading with Asian neighbors such India and Indonesia may have introduced certain spices to the Filipino diet especially in areas such as Mindanao, which was most likely lost due to Spanish colonization. Much of the practice were introduced by the Spaniards, Chinese or Americans. Some of the most popular vegetables planted are eggplant, taro (gabi), squash, mung bean, ampalaya and patola. However archaeological evidence of charred vegetable matter on porcelain plates is possible evidence of wide of vegetables in the Filipino diet. 
Fruit and Nut CropsThis group is composed of native plants that are found growing in wild areas and non-native plants that have been repeatedly introduced over time. The fruits and nuts sector hasn't been a dominant presence as a food staple but instead it has been considered a complement. Though coconut has been considered a commercial crop due to its wide variety of uses, it is still only a complementary or specialty itemjust as the other crops in this category. Some of the most popular fruits include banana, jackfruit, papaya and mango.
Beverage CropsThe closest thing the Philippines has to a traditional national drink is tuba. The tuba is made by collecting milk from green to ripe coconuts and slightly fermenting the coconut sap and variably dying it with mangrove bark but this has to be made daily and consumed immediately. Tuba can also be made from the sap of the buri palm or from the sap of the nipa palm. Coffee and cacao have also been introduced by the Spaniards and although both plants spread widely and Philippine conditions are suitable for it but neither caught on sufficiently to be promoted as a strong agricultural product.

Fauna
Poultry and fish are the main sources of meat in the Philippines. Pigs, chicken and water buffalos (carabao) are not only of importance to the Philippine rice economy but are also consumed by many Filipinos. But because the Philippines is located in the Indo-Pacific realm, the greatest center of fish life, the country is one that shares in this rich aquatic resource with a total of more than 21,000 species of fishes known to frequent its waters.
Livestock and PoultryPigs, chicken, goats, deer water buffaloes and others dominate food consumption but there has also been the presence of ducks and geese as these are also present in southeast Asian mainland and therefore also the Philippines. Foreign influences later appeared as the country was colonized by different colonizers. The Spaniards added mutton to the traditional rice-fish-pork-chicken-beef dietary and the American further strengthened this influence so that lamb or mutton consumption increased steadily. Eggs also became a minor food supply to the dietary such as one local delicacy, the balut, which is an almost-hatched duck eggs cooked in boiling water in the shell.
Fish and Other SeafoodsThe traditional and basic Filipino diet is rice and fish. Fish and fish products supply the bulk of the protein consumed and fish appears daily for more the one-half of the Filipinos. As the Philippines is surrounded by waters, almost every family did fishing regularly or seasonally. Some usual fishes found in Philippine waters include dilis or anchovies that are abundant in the Visayan Sea, Sulu Sea, Samar Sea and waters of north Palawan and usually dried or processed to make bagoong, sardines or tamban that are numerous in Sulu and Visayan Seas and are cured, dried or salted to make tinapa, and dalagangbukid that are generally caught over the coral reefs in Sulu or Palawan waters and is later prepared as daing. Crustaceans such as shrimp and crabs are also abundant in Philippine coastal waters.

Due to geographic conditions in the Philippines, native fish are preserved to combat rapid spoilage which includes preservation by drying, salting and smoking. In drying, large fishes are usually used to make daing while smaller fishes are used to make cuyo. Salting and wet-salting is a popular practice in areas that are relatively remote from large markets due to seasonality of fishing season. While smoking fish or the process of making tinapa is done by brining, cooking and smoking that is usually done in places surrounding Manila Bay such as Bataan and Rizal.

Some ethnolinguistic groups and their diet
BontoksRice is considered as the main produce of the Bontoks but during the dry periods from February to March when rain is scarce, they usually consume camote, corn and millet as alternative for rice. They also catch and gather fish, snails and crabs for consumption or for sale. In the earlier days, Bontok men usually brought tobacco and matches when hunting for wild deer and wild pigs. In the forests, they also gather rattan, edible fruits, beeswax and honey, and wild edible or ornamental plants.
IbaloisBecause of fertile soils and climate of Benguet, the Ibaloys are predominantly farmers. There are two varieties of rice. These are the kintoman and talon. The kintoman is the red variety of rice that is long grained, tastier and comes in various forms; the balatin-naw which is soft and sticky when cooked, the shaya-ut which is also soft, and the putaw which is slightly rough on the palate when eaten. This variety of rice is also used to make the native rice wine called tafey. The second variety of rice, the talon, on the other hand, is the white lowland type that is planted during the rainy season. Ibaloys also plant root crops like camote, gabi, cassava and potatoes. Vegetation includes cabbage, celery and pechay. There are also several kinds of mushrooms wildly in addition to fruits like avocados, bananas and mangoes grown in many areas. Meat consumed includes pigs, cows, goats and chickens as well as wild deer (olsa), wild pigs (alimanok) and big lizard (tilay). Lastly, the Ibaloys consume fish from the few rivers in their area.
IkalahansSimilar with the Ibaloys, the Ikalahans plant and consume this variety of rice in limited areas. Camote, gabi, beans, bananas, ginger and other fruit trees are also planted. Animals consumed include wild pigs, deer, birds, wild chickens and fishes. Domesticated pigs was not only used for consumption but also as a symbol of wealth while domesticated chicken are used as a source of food during childbirth or illness but is not a part of the regular diet.
IfugaosThe basic meal of the Ifugaos is composed of a staple starch, more commonly rice as it is their staple food, served with dishes like vegetables, fish or snails, flavorings, and sometimes, cooked animal meat like chicken and pig. During low levels of rice, ifugaos consume grain or root crops like sweet potatoes. Fresh berries and other plant products and plants are served as snacks. Rice wine is a must in most rituals and special occasions with homemade yeast and glutinous rice as the basic ingredients.
IsnegsThe isnegs traditionally only consume two meals a day; one in the mid-morning and one in the late afternoon, or one at noon and the other in the evening. Though most of their meals include rice, rice is always scarce because of the limited womanpower. Hence, they resort to trade to satisfy demands. Meals also include vegetables and root crops such as camote and occasionally, fish and wild pig or wild deer. Dogs, pigs and chickens are only eaten during feasts and chicken eggs are seldom eaten because they are generally allowed to hatch. Sometimes, before or after meals, the typical isneg families enjoy home-grown coffee while gathering around the hearth while rice wine is only consumed during festive occasions.
KalingasDue to the availability of water, two planting seasons are possible in the kalingas rice terraces. They plant three varieties of rice namely onoy, oyak and dikit/diket. Men also hunt for wild pigs, deer and wild fowl in the forests. Fish, shells and other marine life are caught from rivers, streams and lakes surrounding their area. Fruit trees such as the coconut, coffee and banana are grown in the orchard or kakkaju. Wine (basi) is also made from sugarcane.
Kankana-eys
NorthernWet rice agriculture is their main economic activity with some fields toiled twice a year while other only once due to too much water or no water at all. There are two varieties of rice called topeng which are planted in June and July and harvested in November and December, and ginolot which are planted in November and December and harvested in June and July. Northern kankana-eys also farm camote. Camote delicacies include (1) makimpit which are dried camotes, (2) boko which are camote sliced into thin pieces that could be steamed (sinalopsop) or cooked as in and sweetened with sugar (inab-abos-sang). These are good substitutes for rice that could be sliced into thin pieces and added to rice before cooking (kineykey) mixing the sweetness when the rice cooks. Squash, cucumber and other climbing vines are also planted. They also hunt and fish small fishes and eel which is a special delicacy when cooked. Crabs are also caught to make tengba, a gravy of pounded rice mixed with crabs, salted and placed in jars to age. This is common viand of every household and is eaten during childbirth.
SouthernAlthough southern kankana-eys also engage in wet rice agriculture, the chief means of livelihood is hunting and foraging. Wild animal meat such as deer, boar, civet cats and lizards are salted and dried under the sun to preserve it. Wild roots, honey and fruits are also gathered to supplement diet. Just like their northern counterparts, there are also two varieties of rice namely kintoman and saranay or bayag. The kintoman, just as mentioned earlier, is more popularly known as red rice due to its color. On the other hand, saranay is whitish and small grained. The usual types of fish caught are eel (dagit or igat) and small river fishes as well as crabs and other crustaceans. Pigs, chickens, dogs and cattle are domesticated as additional sources of food. Dog meat is considered as a delicacy and pigs and chickens are used mainly for ceremonial activities.
Tingguians/ItnegsJust like in most parts of the Philippines, rice is extensively grown in the province. There are two types of practices for rice cultivation namely wet-rice cultivation and swidden/kaingin. Corn is also planted as a major subsistence and as a replacement for rice. Other products consumed are camote, yams, coconut, mango, banana and vegetables. Sugarcane is planted to make wine usually consumed during traditional rituals and ceremonies. Pigs and chickens are consumed for food or for religious rituals while carabaos are killed during large celebrations. Hunting wild animals and fishing is also prevalent. Eel and other freshwater fish such as paleleng and ladgo(lobster) are caught to make viands for most families.

Ancient health

Methods used in determining ancient health
Ancient people, especially Filipinos, don’t have formal professional doctors. There are only men in each group or tribe who have knowledge of healing herbs and practices. These men are the so-called healers or curers of the group who were respected until they lose their reputation. These healers, who are also called albularyo today, know unique methods of determining the condition of his/her patients. Hilot and tawas are some of the ancient practices used to identify the health of certain individuals. No mineral medicines are used. They highly depend on the herbs, bark and roof of trees, leaves of plants and vegetables for their medicine. Ancient Filipinos also believe that their health is greatly affected or influenced by the spirits and natural forces around them. They make no attempt to explain or justify their “theories of disease” in a systematic and logical manner. They also believe that skin diseases are brought upon by a ‘theory’ of attachment to the body or sometimes, inherited from past ancestors.

Diseases
Ancient Filipinos did not believe that their diet and eating habits affect their health. They believed that allergies, food sensitivities and other diseases that may be seen outside of the body are effects of spirits’ actions. Diseases that don’t have “outside of the body symptoms” like diabetes, heart disease, or kidney disease were ignored. They only believed that their diet can affect their teeth. To avoid tooth decay, they chewed betel nut or tobacco because they believe that these kill the “worms” that were brought by drinking water or eating food.

Currently "very low consumption of vegetables, fruits, and whole grains were the main contributing factors for the poor quality of diet [...] fruits, vegetables and snack pattern was associated to a lower risks of cardiometabolic risks, lower risk of overweight, obesity, diabetes, dyslipidemia, and hypertension".

References

Health in the Philippines
History of food and drink